The 2005 Saskatchewan Scott Tournament of Hearts women's provincial curling championship, was held February 2–6 at the Assiniboia Civic Centre in Assiniboia, Saskatchewan. The winning team of Stefanie Lawton, represented Saskatchewan at the 2005 Scott Tournament of Hearts in St. John's, Newfoundland and Labrador, where the team finished round robin with a 7-4 record, losing the 3-4 game to Ontario's Jenn Hanna

Teams

Standings

Results

Draw 1
February 2, 2:00 PM CT

Draw 2
February 2, 8:00 PM CT

Draw 3
February 3, 9:30 AM CT

Draw 4
February 3, 2:00 PM CT

Draw 5
February 4, 1:00 PM CT

Draw 6
February 4, 7:00 PM CT

Draw 7
February 5, 9:30 AM CT

Playoffs

Semifinal
February 5, 7:00 PM CT

Final
February 6, 2:00 PM CT

References

Saskatchewan Scotties Tournament Of Hearts, 2005
Saskatchewan Scott Tournament of Hearts
Saskatchewan Scott Tournament of Hearts
Curling in Saskatchewan